IRA is a Polish rock band formed in 1987 in Radom by Jakub Płucisz (guitar), Wojciech Owczarek (drums), Artur Gadowski (vocal, guitar), Dariusz Grudzień (bass) and Grzegorz Wawrzeńczuk (keyboards). They gained wide popularity in Poland in the early nineties, mainly after releasing the "Mój Dom" album, with the hit title song, which dates back to their garage and semi-professional days. They also gained some local popularity amongst Polish-speaking citizens in the United States, where they lived and worked for few months. After signing a professional contract back in Poland, they released a few albums which did not prove to be commercially successful (except for the "Mój Dom" follow-up, which was "IRA 1993"), and the band disbanded afterwards. Artur Gadowski started a solo career. He opened for Brian May before his show in Warsaw in September 1998. Artur's solo efforts were not very successful either, and what success he did gain was largely based on the then high profile of IRA.

A few years later the band reunited, and remains active. Once again, they have not attained much popularity, but are well known amongst hard rock fans in Poland, and their concerts are well attended.

The name "IRA" comes from a Latin word ira, meaning anger (this was the band founders' intention). However, this has been mistaken for the acronym of the Irish Republican Army.

Discography

References

External links
Official website

Polish rock music groups